Nasir Allan Adderley (born May 31, 1997) is a former American football safety who played for four seasons in the National Football League (NFL) for the Los Angeles Chargers. He played college football at Delaware and was drafted by the Chargers in the second round of the 2019 NFL Draft.

Early years
Adderley attended Great Valley High School in Malvern, Pennsylvania. He committed to the University of Delaware to play college football.

College career
Adderley played at Delaware from 2015 to 2018. After spending his first two years as a cornerback, he switched to safety prior to his junior season in 2017. During his career, he had 226 tackles and 10 interceptions.

Professional career

Adderley was drafted by the Los Angeles Chargers in the second round (60th overall) of the 2019 NFL Draft. He played in the first four games, primarily on special teams, before aggravating a hamstring injury. He missed the next three games before being placed on injured reserve on October 26, 2019.

In Week 5 of the 2020 season against the New Orleans Saints on Monday Night Football, Adderley recorded his first career interception off a pass thrown by Drew Brees during the 30–27 overtime loss.

Retirement
Adderley announced his retirement from football on March 16, 2023, after his contract with the Chargers expired.

Personal life
His third cousin, Herb Adderley, was an NFL cornerback for the Green Bay Packers and was inducted in the Pro Football Hall of Fame.

References

External links
Delaware Blue Hens bio

1997 births
Living people
Players of American football from Philadelphia
American football safeties
American football cornerbacks
Delaware Fightin' Blue Hens football players
Los Angeles Chargers players